Stella Kramer  (born 22 March 1989) is a German handball player for Borussia Dortmund Handball and the German national team.

She was part of the team at the 2016 European Women's Handball Championship.

References

1989 births
Living people
German female handball players
People from Herdecke
Sportspeople from Arnsberg (region)